Southland Park is a neighborhood in southwestern Lexington, Kentucky, United States. Its boundaries are Pasadena Drive to the south, Clays Mill Road to the east, Lane Allen Road to the north, and Harrodsburg Rd to the west.

Neighborhood statistics
 Population in 2000: 1,358
 Land Area: 
 Population density: 2,658
 Median household income: $56,755

External links
 http://www.city-data.com/neighborhood/Southland-Park-Lexington-KY.html

Neighborhoods in Lexington, Kentucky